The Benjamin Logan Local School District, also known as "Benjamin Logan Schools", is a school district comprising the eastern half of Logan County, Ohio, United States. The district is noteworthy for its commitment to agribusiness education, as evidenced by a strong FFA chapter and ties with local college agricultural programs. The school district also partners with local colleges and the Honda corporation to provide teacher exchange opportunities at the middle and high school level and in-school courses in the Japanese language.

History
The district was founded in 1970, consolidated from Buckeye Local Schools, Belle Center Schools, and Logan Hills Schools.

The school district is named after Benjamin Logan (1742–1802), an American pioneer, politician, and general of the Virginia militia.

Schools
Benjamin Logan High School
Benjamin Logan Middle School
Benjamin Logan Elementary School

References

External links

 Benjamin Logan FFA Chapter

School districts in Ohio
Education in Logan County, Ohio
1970 establishments in Ohio
School districts established in 1970